The 2012–13 Australian Baseball League season was the third Australian Baseball League (ABL) season, and was held from 1 November 2012 to 9 February 2013. The season started with a game between the defending champions Perth Heat and the Adelaide Bite at Norwood Oval in Adelaide.

The season consisted of six teams competing in a 46-game schedule followed by a two-round postseason to determine the ABL champion. During the regular season, the Perth Heat participated in the 2012 Asia Series which included the host team and champion team from Korea Baseball Championship in South Korea, the champions from Nippon Professional Baseball in Japan and Chinese Professional Baseball League in Taiwan, and an all-star team from China Baseball League in China. The 2012–13 champions will likewise qualify for the 2013 Asia Series.

At the conclusion of the regular season, the Canberra Cavalry, the Sydney Blue Sox and the Perth Heat progressed to the postseason. Sydney were eliminated by Perth, to face Canberra in the championship series. Canberra defeated Perth two games to nil to win their first ABL championship and be awarded the Claxton Shield. It was the first time a team from the Australian Capital Territory won the Claxton Shield.

Changes from 2011–12 season

Regular season schedule 
The previous season included 45 games for each team and facing each team nine times. This was expanded for the 2012–13 season to 46 games, to ensure that each team had the same number of home games as road games (23). This change also meant that each team did not play each other team an equal number of times. In the first three rounds, each team had a bye for one round and played one home and one away series of three games each, played "... against their two closest geographical neighbours; building upon both traditional and newly established rivalries." The remaining ten rounds were made up of four–game series with each team playing two series against the five other teams, one at home and one away.

Postseason structure 
In previous seasons, the postseason had followed the Page playoff system, with the top four teams participating over three weeks. However, in the 2012-13 season only the top three teams qualified for a two-week postseason. The team that finished first—the Canberra Cavalry—earned a direct entry into the ABL championship series and the right to host the series. The second- and third-placed teams—the Sydney Blue Sox and the Perth Heat respectively—are playing in the preliminary final series hosted by the higher finishing team. The winner of that series will qualify for the championship series. Reduced from five games in the semi-final and preliminary final series in 2012, all rounds of the 2013 postseason are being held as best–of–three game series.

Teams

Venues 
Each of the six teams return from the previous season, and five of them will continue to use the same grounds for their home games. The sole exception is the Melbourne Aces, that played at the Melbourne Ballpark in the south-eastern suburb of Altona. As part of the move from the Aces former home, the Melbourne Showgrounds, A$290,000 worth of improvements were made prior to the start of the season, including A$200,000 investment from the Victorian state government. The ground was the home ground of the Melbourne Monarchs and the Melbourne Bushrangers in the former ABL.

Rosters 
As in the previous season, each team has an active roster of 22 players available each round. These players are drawn from 35-man squads.  These squads will be confirmed by each of the teams before the beginning of the season.

Regular season

Statistical leaders

All-Star Game

The 2012 Australian Baseball League All-Star Game, known as the 2012 ConocoPhillips Australia ABL All-Star Game due to naming rights sponsorship from ConocoPhillips, was the second exhibition game held by the Australian Baseball League (ABL) between Team Australia and a team of World All-Stars. The game was held on Sunday, 16 December 2012 at Melbourne Ballpark in Melbourne, Victoria, the new home of the Melbourne Aces. The players involved were selected from the rosters of the six ABL teams, with players not eligible for selection in the Australian team for international tournaments eligible for the World All-Stars.

Starting lineups

Box score

Postseason 
The 2013 Australian Baseball League (ABL) postseason was held from 2 to 9 February 2013. It was scheduled to start on 1 February, but the first game of the preliminary final series was postponed due to wet weather, and was the first game of a doubleheader the following day. The postseason was contested by three of the six teams participating in the regular season, with the teams with the best winning percentages qualifying.

The preliminary final series was hosted by the Sydney Blue Sox at Blue Sox Stadium in Sydney, against the Perth Heat. The Heat won the series two games to nil, to then face the Canberra Cavalry at Narrabundah Ballpark in Canberra in the championship series. Canberra defeated Perth two games to nil to win their first ABL championship and be awarded the Claxton Shield. It was the first time a team from the Australian Capital Territory won the Claxton Shield

Format 
At the conclusion of the regular season, the postseason will involve the teams in a two-round structure. Each round will consist of a best-of-three game series between the respective teams. The first-placed team will directly qualify for the championship series, and the second- and third-placed teams will play each other in the preliminary final series, the winner of which will qualify for the second place in the championship series.

Bracket

Qualification 
The Sydney Blue Sox were the first team to clinch a postseason berth, when they defeated the Brisbane Bandits in the first game of their second series at Blue Sox Stadium in Sydney, the final series of the regular season. In the second game of the same series the following night, the Blue Sox clinched a home postseason series by beating the Bandits again. The Canberra Cavalry clinched their first ABL postseason berth that same night, when they defeated the Adelaide Bite at Norwood Oval in Adelaide. The win also guaranteed a regular season finish no lower than second, and like the Blue Sox assured the Cavalry oh hosting a home postseason series.

The final makeup of the postseason bracket was not determined until the final day of the regular season. The Cavalry guaranteed themselves first place and a place in the championship series when they beat the Bite in their final game. This win also confirmed the Blue Sox would finish in second place and host the preliminary final series. The Perth Heat qualified for the final postseason position when they defeated the Melbourne Aces at Baseball Park in Perth in their final game. The win eliminated the Bandits from contention.

Preliminary final 

The Sydney Blue Sox hosted the Perth Heat in the preliminary final series at Blue Sox Stadium. The Blue Sox and Heat split their season series 4–4. The four game series played in Sydney in November 2012 was also split 2–2. Over the three ABL seasons played up until this series, Perth has the better record head-to-head against Sydney, with a record of 18–9. The two teams have met in one postseason series before, in the 2011 major semi-final: the Perth Heat won the series 2–0 in Sydney.

The first game of the series was scheduled to be played on 1 February, but was postponed due to wet weather. It was rescheduled to be the first game of a doubleheader the following day.

Game 1

Game 2

Championship series 

The Canberra Cavalry will host the Perth Heat in the championship series at Narrabundah Ballpark. The Cavalry won their season series against the Heat 6–2. The four game series played in Canberra in January 2013 was won by Canberra 3–1. Over the three ABL seasons played up until this series, Canberra has the better record head-to-head against Perth, with a record of 13–12. The two teams have not previously met in a postseason series; Canberra qualified for the postseason for the first time in 2013.

Game 1

Game 2

Awards

References

External links 
The Australian Baseball League – Official ABL Website
Official Baseball Australia Website

 
Australian Baseball League seasons
Australian Baseball League
Australian Baseball League